Daft Punk were a French electronic music duo that recorded over 90 songs between 1994 and 2021. The duo has been influential in the dance and French house genres of music. Beginning in 1992 as Darlin' with Laurent Brancowitz, the group disbanded in 1993, and Bangalter and de Homem-Christo formed Daft Punk. The pair's first single, "The New Wave", was released in 1994. Their next single, "Da Funk", was their first commercial success, and is now seen as a house music classic. After the success of "Da Funk", Daft Punk released their first studio album, Homework, in 1997. The album's songs are heavily inspired by funk and dance music, and features "thick, rumbling bass and vocoders". Homework brought worldwide attention to French house music.

Their follow-up, the concept album Discovery, was released in 2001. The album's sound is different from its predecessor, being noticeably influenced by disco music and is characterised as more polished; Discovery was supported by the Franco-Japanese animated film Interstella 5555: The 5tory of the 5ecret 5tar 5ystem. Later that year, the group released their first live album, Alive 1997.  The album contains a forty-five minute excerpt from a live show in 1997. The duo's next album, Human After All, was released in 2005. Made in only six weeks, the album's songs have been described as repetitive and minimalist, and is less produced than Homework and Discovery. Songs from the album would later be used for the group's second live album, the critically acclaimed Alive 2007.

In 2010, the group composed the film score for Disney's Tron: Legacy; the soundtrack album was released later that year. The album's songs have been described as "soaring and ominous" and take inspiration from modern classical music. During this time, the duo recorded a song called "Computerized" with American rapper Jay-Z; the song remains officially unreleased. The band released their fourth studio album, Random Access Memories, in 2013. The album deviated from the duo's previous works by featuring live instrumentation and an array of guest musicians, including Pharrell Williams, Nile Rodgers, Julian Casablancas, and Giorgio Moroder on tracks such as "Lose Yourself to Dance", "Instant Crush", and "Giorgio by Moroder", respectively. Backed by the lead single, "Get Lucky", the album was a major critical and commercial success, topping multiple year-end lists and earning the group multiple Grammy Awards. The song "Horizon" was released as bonus track on the Japanese edition of Random Access Memories. Since 2013, the duo has collaborated with multiple artists, such as the Weeknd, being a featured artist on his songs "Starboy" and "I Feel It Coming" from his 2016 album Starboy. The duo announced their breakup in February 2021.

Songs

Notes

References

See also
 Daft Punk discography

Daft Punk